Louis Hippolyte Bouteille (2 January  1804, Saint-Gilles-du-Gard - 19 August 1881,  Grenoble ) was a French ornithologist

Bouteille studied  pharmacy at Avignon from 1820 to  1822, then at Geneva  from 1822 to 1825 then at Lyon from 1825 to 1827. He moved to Grenoble obtained pharmaceutical qualification from Faculté de Montpellier in 1833 where he practised.

A naturalist from his youth he studied insects and birds. In 1843 he published Ornithologie du Dauphiné, ou Description des oiseaux observés dans les départements de l'Isère, de la Drôme, des Hautes-Alpes(two volumes). He closed his shop in 1847  when he gained  the post of Conservateur  at  Muséum d'histoire naturelle de Grenoble :fr:Muséum d'histoire naturelle de Grenoble to the detriment of Albin Crépu (1799–1859).

Bouteille supervised the construction du Muséum in the Jardin des plantes considerably enriched the collections. He founded "la Société d'acclimatation des Alpes" also the Jardin d'acclimatation de Grenoble in 1854. He was also the author of  Faune de l’Oisans in Essai descriptif de l’Oisans d'Aristide Albert (1821–1903).

References
Maurice Boubier, L’Évolution de l’ornithologie, Alcan, coll. Nouvelle collection scientifique, Paris, 1925, ii + 308 p.

French ornithologists
1804 births
1881 deaths